Debra Joy Lampshire  is a New Zealand trainer, educator, advocate and experience-based expert on mental health.

Work 
Lampshire is project manager for the Psychological Interventions for Enduring Mental Illness Project at the Auckland District Health Board (ADHB). She is the first non-clinician to hold this position.

She is also a senior tutor with the Centre for Mental Health Research and Policy Development at the University of Auckland.

She is chairperson for International Society for Psychological and Social Approaches to Psychosis (ISPS) New Zealand.

Background
At the age of 17, she was committed to the former Kingseat Psychiatric Hospital in Karaka, having episodes of psychosis, including hearing voices. She has been in mental health care for 30 years, 18 of those in institutional care. She then began to take charge of her own recovery and has transferred her own experience to educate others.

She has co-authored scientific papers and co-edited the book Experiencing Psychosis.

Honours and awards
Lampshire won the Making a Difference category of the Attitude Awards, and the Supreme Award at the 2016 Attitude Awards. In the 2023 New Year Honours, she was appointed a Member of the New Zealand Order of Merit, for services to mental health.

Works
 Jim Geekie (editor), Patte Randal (editor), Debra Lampshire (editor): Experiencing Psychosis: Personal and Professional Perspectives. The International Society for Psychological and Social Approaches to Psychosis Book Series, The International Society for Psychological Treatments of Schizophrenia and Other Psychoses,  2011,

See also
 Hearing Voices Movement
 Rethinking Madness
 Anatomy of an Epidemic
 David Oaks
 Kay Redfield Jamison

References

External links
 Mental health experience leads to Supreme Award, University of Auckland, 19 December 2016
 Ms Debra Lampshire (with a list of publications)

Psychosis
Living people
Year of birth missing (living people)
Members of the New Zealand Order of Merit
Mental health activists